The Fairfield Historic District encompasses the historic town center of Fairfield, Connecticut, roughly along Old Post Road between U.S. Route 1 and Turney Road.  The area contains Fairfield's town hall, public library, and houses dating from the late 18th century, and includes portions of the town's earliest colonial settlement area.  The district was listed on the National Register of Historic Places in 1971.

History
Fairfield's town center was laid out in the 17th century by its founders, who included Roger Ludlow.  The area was divided into Four Squares, one for Ludlow, one for a minister, one for civic buildings, and one for a town common.  Elements of this early division survive in the layout and placement of civic and religious buildings.  The village center was burned in 1779 by British troops during the American Revolutionary War, resulting in the destruction of all of the town's civic buildings and many houses.  The district hosts a concentration of houses that did survive the military raid, and the town hall, built in 1794, is still evocative of the architecture of that period.

Contributing elements
It extends from a junction of Old Post Road with US 1 in the west, to Turney Road in the east, and includes buildings on Old Post Road and a few cross streets. The most significant elements of the historic district include:
the town green
the town hall
the Rising Sun Tavern, No. 1 Town Hall Green, built 1783
Silliman House, 543 Old Post Road, built 1791 by William Silliman, son of militia general Gold Selleck Silliman
the Fairfield Academy, now known as Old Academy, which was moved
249 Beach Road, which reportedly survived the British burning by a servant dowsing the flames (see photo page 15 of accompanying photos)
303 Beach Road, 
349 Beach Road, a saltbox house from before 1750
Burr Mansion, 739 Old Post Road
952 Old Post Road

See also
National Register of Historic Places listings in Fairfield County, Connecticut

References

External links 

Fairfield, Connecticut
Historic districts in Fairfield County, Connecticut
National Register of Historic Places in Fairfield County, Connecticut
Historic districts on the National Register of Historic Places in Connecticut